The Postmaster-General in New Zealand was the government minister responsible for the New Zealand Post Office (NZPO) from 1858 to 1989, when the NZPO (formerly the Post and Telegraph Department) was split into three State Owned Enterprises, responsible to the Minister of State Owned Enterprises: New Zealand Post Limited, Telecom New Zealand Limited, and Post Office Bank Limited.

History
From 1841 to 1853 the Postmaster-General was a civil servant, responsible to the Postmaster-General of New South Wales (1841–42) then the Postmaster-General of Great Britain (1842–53).

Governor Sir George Grey appointed Henry William Petre to be Postmaster-General on 13 August 1853, but his appointment was not accepted by the First Parliament that met in 1854, and he left for England early in the new year.

Office holders
The following MPs have held the office of Postmaster-General:

Key

Notes

References  
 

Lists of government ministers of New Zealand
New Zealand
Political office-holders in New Zealand